In Greek mythology, Lamia (Ancient Greek: Λάμια) was a daughter of Poseidon, and mother, by Zeus, of the Libyan Sibyl. It was perhaps this Lamia who, according to Stesichorus, was the mother of Scylla.

Notes

References
 Fowler, R. L., Early Greek Mythography: Volume 2: Commentary, Oxford University Press, 2013. .
 Gantz, Timothy, Early Greek Myth: A Guide to Literary and Artistic Sources, Johns Hopkins University Press, 1996, Two volumes:  (Vol. 1),  (Vol. 2).
 Grimal, Pierre, The Dictionary of Classical Mythology, Wiley-Blackwell, 1996, . "Lamia 1." p. 248.
 Pausanias, Pausanias Description of Greece with an English Translation by W.H.S. Jones, Litt.D., and H.A. Ormerod, M.A., in 4 Volumes. Cambridge, MA, Harvard University Press; London, William Heinemann Ltd. 1918. Online version at the Perseus Digital Library.
 Smith, William; Dictionary of Greek and Roman Biography and Mythology, London (1873). "Lamia 1." 

Children of Poseidon
Mortal women of Zeus